is a Japanese singer and actor. He is best known for appearing on television in tokusatsu and other dramas, such as Yuusuke Amamiya (Red Falcon) in the series Choujuu Sentai Liveman, as Shuji Koboku in Tokyo Elevator Girl, as Captain Harumitsu Hiura in Ultraman Cosmos, and as the cafe owner in Kisarazu Cat's Eye.

Filmography

TV series

Film

Soundtrack
 Hyakujuu Sentai Gaoranger vs. Super Sentai

References 
 ^ A b c d "TV Talent Author Encyclopedia 5th edition" Nichigai Associates, 2001, 521 pages. .
 ^ Even though Daisuke Shima conference ran also political parties, "white paper", Nikkan Sports, April 26, 2013 9:06.
 ^ Daisuke Shima, showbiz retirement! To the political challenge, sports broadcast, April 25, 2013 6:02.
 ^ Determine owner-Daisuke Shima crown name is in the "Oldenburg"! - UMA-JIN 2010 November 10
 ^ "TV Talent Author Encyclopedia 5th edition" Nichigai Associates, 2001, 522 pages. .
 ^ "House of Councillors election," white paper "is also a man of distinction ... Daisuke Shima entertainment industry retirement and political advance" Sponichi Annex (4 May 26, 2013) View July 13, 2015...
 ^ "Daisuke Shima House of Councillors election and Tokyo Metropolitan Assembly election horse abandoned ... the Liberal Democratic Party not obtained official recognition" Sponichi Annex (6 May 14, 2013) View July 13, 2015...
 ^ "Daisuke Shima curry Nabeten produced" Daily Sports (May 27, 2015) View June 18, 2015...
 ^ "Daisuke Shima, announced the entertainment industry return" your shame "retirement press conference from two years" ORICON (7 May 13, 2015) View July 13, 2015...
 ^ At that time, the Super Sentai series first work had been a "Battle Fever J" of 1979. Currently has a "secret squadron FiveRangers" of 1975 have been the first work eyes.
 ^ http://www.mognet.net/artist_info.php?id=422

External links
 [Profile by https://web.archive.org/web/20160401154839/http://www.enjoy-inc.jp/%E5%B6%8B%E5%A4%A7%E8%BC%94/ enjoy]
 [Profile by https://web.archive.org/web/20160306214147/http://www.bugsy.co.jp/talent/shimadaisuke.html Bugsy Heroes Club]
 official MySpace
 Daisuke Shima "man of honor" (January 21, 2007 April to 2008)
 Daisuke Shima official blog "man of honor" (January 21, 2008) - closure. (As of January 22, 2013 Archive)
 Daisuke Shima owner diary
 Daisuke Shima "promise a man of" official Facebook page (to April 10, 2013)
 

Japanese male singers
Japanese male actors
Actors from Hyōgo Prefecture
1964 births
Living people
Musicians from Hyōgo Prefecture